This is a list of museums in Rwanda.

Museums in Rwanda 

Kandt House Museum of Natural History 
Ethnographic Museum
Campaign Against Genocide Museum
Rwanda Art Museum
King's Palace Museum
Museum of Environment
Kwigira Museum
National Liberation Museum
 Tutsi Genocide Memorial site
Rwesero Art Museum

See also 

 List of museums
Institute of National Museums of Rwanda

External links 

Museums
 
Museums
Rwanda
Museums
Rwanda